Inside Out is an album by American jazz trumpeter Eddie Henderson recorded in 1973 and released on the Capricorn label.

Reception
The Allmusic review by Richard S. Ginell called it "open-ended and almost free, heavily electronic, spiritual in intent, and enormously stimulating".

Track listing
All compositions by Eddie Henderson except as indicated
 "Moussaka" (Bennie Maupin) - 8:59
 "Omnipresence" - 2:14
 "Discoveries" - 5:08
 "Fusion" - 3:33
 "Dreams" - 7:21
 "Inside Out" - 9:25
 "Exit #1" (Maupin) - 2:54

Personnel
Eddie Henderson - trumpet, flugelhorn, cornet
Bennie Maupin - clarinet, bass clarinet, flute, alto flute, piccolo flute, tenor saxophone
Herbie Hancock - electric piano, clavinet, organ
Patrick Gleeson - synthesizer
Buster Williams - bass, electric bass
Eric Gravatt, Billy Hart - drums
Bill Summers - congas

References 

Capricorn Records albums
Eddie Henderson (musician) albums
1974 albums